Charles Meade was the founder of a church.

Charles Meade may also refer to:

Charles Francis Meade, mountaineer
Charles Meade, character in The Secret Circle (TV series)